Catascopus is a genus of beetles in the family Carabidae, containing the following species:

 Catascopus aculeatus Chaudoir, 1861 
 Catascopus aeneus Saunders, 1863 
 Catascopus aequatus Dejean, 1831 
 Catascopus agnatus Chaudoir, 1872 
 Catascopus alesi Jedlicka, 1935 
 Catascopus andamanensis Chaudoir, 1877 
 Catascopus andrewesi Louwerens, 1951 
 Catascopus angulatus Chaudoir, 1861 
 Catascopus aruensis Saunders, 1863 
 Catascopus balthasari Jedlicka, 1935 
 Catascopus beauvoisi Laporte De Castelnau, 1835 
 Catascopus beccarii Straneo, 1943 
 Catascopus bellus Andrewes, 1921 
 Catascopus biroi Darlington, 1968 
 Catascopus brachypterus Chaudoir, 1861 
 Catascopus brasiliensis Dejean, 1831 
 Catascopus brevispinosus Sloane, 1910 
 Catascopus brunneus Darlington, 1968 
 Catascopus bryanti Andrewes, 1921 
 Catascopus chalydicus Olliff, 1885 
 Catascopus chaudoiri Laporte De Castelnau, 1867 
 Catascopus cingalensis Bates, 1886 
 Catascopus clarus Andrewes, 1930 
 Catascopus cupripennis J.Thomson, 1857 
 Catascopus cyanellus Chaudoir, 1848
 Catascopus cyaneus Chaudoir, 1848 
 Catascopus dalbertisi Straneo, 1943 
 Catascopus defanisi Straneo, 1994 
 Catascopus diffinis Chaudoir, 1872 
 Catascopus dobodura Darlington, 1968  
 Catascopus elegans (Weber, 1801)
 Catascopus elegantulus Jedlicka, 1935 
 Catascopus erwini Straneo, 1994 
 Catascopus facialis (Wiedemann, 1819)
 Catascopus fuscoaeneus Chaudoir, 1872
 Catascopus hardwickei Kirby, 1825 
 Catascopus hexagonus Straneo, 1994 
 Catascopus hinei Straneo, 1994 
 Catascopus horni Jedlicka, 1932
 Catascopus ignicinctus Bates, 1883 
 Catascopus illustris Andrewes, 1937 
 Catascopus jenkinsi Andrewes, 1937 
 Catascopus keralensis Straneo, 1994 
 Catascopus laevigatus Saunders, 1863 
 Catascopus laevipennis Saunders, 1863 
 Catascopus laotinus Andrewes, 1921
 Catascopus laticollis W.J.Macleay, 1883 
 Catascopus latimargo Straneo, 1994 
 Catascopus latus Darlington, 1968 
 Catascopus lissonotus Andrewes, 1921 
 Catascopus lumawigi Straneo, 1994 
 Catascopus marani Jedlicka, 1935  
 Catascopus mirabilis Bates, 1892
 Catascopus moorei Straneo, 1994 
 Catascopus obscuroviridis Chevrolat, 1835 
 Catascopus pecirkai Jedlicka, 1935 
 Catascopus phlogops Andrewes, 1926 
 Catascopus praesidens (J.Thomson, 1857) 
 Catascopus punctipennis Saunders, 1863 
 Catascopus quadrispina Straneo, 1994 
 Catascopus regalis Schmidt-Gobel, 1846 
 Catascopus rex Darlington, 1968 
 Catascopus riedeli Baehr, 1997 
 Catascopus rufipes Gory, 1833 
 Catascopus rufofemoratus Chaudoir, 1837 
 Catascopus saphyrinus Andrewes, 1921 
 Catascopus sauteri Dopuis, 1914 
 Catascopus savagei Hope, 1842  
 Catascopus schaumi Saunders, 1863 
 Catascopus senegalensis Dejean, 1831  
 Catascopus sidus Darlington, 1968 
 Catascopus similaris Xia & Yu, 1992 
 Catascopus simillimus Straneo, 1994 
 Catascopus simplex Chaudoir, 1872 
 Catascopus smaragdulus Dejean, 1825 
 Catascopus specularis Imhoff, 1843 
 Catascopus strigicollis Straneo, 1943 
 Catascopus subquadratus Motschulsky, 1864 
 Catascopus thailandicus Straneo, 1994 
 Catascopus uelensis Burgeon, 1930 
 Catascopus validus Chaudoir, 1854 
 Catascopus versicolor Saunders, 1863 
 Catascopus violaceus Schmidt-Gobel, 1846
 Catascopus virens Chaudoir, 1872 
 Catascopus viridicupreus Jedlicka, 1935 
 Catascopus viridis Jedlicka, 1935 
 Catascopus vitalisi Dupuis, 1914 
 Catascopus vollenhoveni Chaudoir, 1872 
 Catascopus wallacei Saunders, 1863 
 Catascopus whithillii Hope, 1838

References

Lebiinae